King Caw or Cawn (fl. 495–501 AD) was a semi-legendary king of Strathclyde in Scotland.
Very little hard fact is known of him. He flourished in the Hen Ogledd Period of Sub-Roman Britain and ruled from a castle at Alt Clut. Legend holds he fought King Arthur. He came to power in 495 AD by deposing King Tutagual, but only managed to remain in power for six years before being removed from power himself. This was a very turbulent time and coincided with the Anglo-Saxon invasion of England. Following this he fled to Wales.

Children
He was the father to many children, many of whom were saints. The most well known was Gildas, which possibly accounts for the poor presentation of King Arthur (and also Constantine) in Gildas' writing.
His children are reputed to include:
 Hywel
 Ane
 Aneurin
 Saint Caffo
 Ceidio
 Aeddan Foeddog
 Cwyllog
 Dirynig
 Saint Cain
 Saint Eigrad
 Samson of York
 Saint Eigron
 Gwenafwy
 Gallo
 Saint Peirio
 Cewydd
 Maelog
 Meilig
 Gwrddelw
 Gwrhai
 Huail mab caw

See also
 Romano-British 
 early Dark Ages, 
 Wales in the Early Middle Ages

References

Year of birth unknown
Welsh royalty
Legendary monarchs